Nikos Triantafyllakis (born 1 January 1983) is a retired Greek football midfielder.

He made his professional debut for Kalamata in the 2000 Intertoto Cup against FK Chmel Blšany. In addition to two spells in Kalamata he played for a string of lower-league clubs.

References

1983 births
Living people
Greek footballers
Kalamata F.C. players
Panetolikos F.C. players
Thyella Patras F.C. players
Rodos F.C. players
Iraklis Psachna F.C. players
Panegialios F.C. players
Association football midfielders
Footballers from Agrinio